South Asia Peace Initiative (SAPI) promotes peace and cooperation through leadership consultations and grassroots activities in South Asian nations is a civil society initiative. There had been already 17 series of SAPI conference organized in Nepal, India, and Afghanistan and this initiatives will further continue. Former Minister of the Ministry of Co-operatives and Poverty Alleviation (Nepal) of the Government of Nepal and Member of the Nepalese Constituent Assembly Ek Nath Dhakal is a convener of South Asia Peace Initiative.

Activities 
Nepal:
Reconciling political divisions, addressing conflicts, and cultivating the spirit of one family under God have been foremost programs in this Himalayan nation. A special focus has been high-level consultations as a new constitution is drafted and the state restructured. Grassroots activities such as service, education, and health care programs for youth along with various community development projects are on-going.

Afghanistan
Bringing together people from various sectors of society to discuss common values, build friendships, and help the less fortunate while working together for peace to a war-ravaged land. Programs are supported by Ambassadors for Peace from all levels of society.

Bangladesh: Promoting interreligious dialogue and strengthening marriage and family are on-going programs. Peacebuilding also means investing in the education and health of the next generation.

India: 
As the world's largest democracy seeks to manage its new-found economic prosperity, leadership consultations promote interreligious cooperation and encourage good governance. In addition, young people are brought together from diverse backgrounds to build mutual understanding and to teach basic values that will ensure a bright future.

Pakistan: Young people are brought together from diverse backgrounds to build bridges of understanding and help local communities supported by leadership that embraces the values of both Pakistani and Indian cultures.

Sri Lanka: Overcoming religious prejudice among the youth while learning the value of living for others has been a hallmark of the projects of this island nation. This naturally leads to serving local communities, promoting good sportsmanship, and character education initiatives. Leadership consultations likewise promote principles of good governance.

History of South Asia Peace Initiatives

 SAPI -1: (22 July 2005), Lumbini, Nepal Innovative Approaches to Peace through Responsible Leadership and Good Governance
 SAPI-2: (12 November 2005), Kathmandu University, Dhulikhel, Nepal South Asian Conflicts: The Non-Violent Option
 SAPI-3: (15 March 2006), Peace Embassy Building, Kathmandu, Nepal Regional Conflicts in South Asia: The Human Dimension
 SAPI -4: (26 June 2006) Hotel Radisson, Kathmandu, Nepal Human Rights and Human Responsibilities: In Conflict and Post-Conflict Situations
 SAPI – 5: (6 December 2006), Hotel Le Meridien, Gokarna, Kathmandu, Nepal In Support of the Peace Process: The Role of National and International Civil Society
 SAPI – 6: (1 December 2007), Peace Embassy Building, Kathmandu, Nepal Supporting the Peace Process at the Civil Society Level: National and International Perspective
 SAPI -7: (23 December 2008), Peace Embassy Building, Kathmandu, Nepal The Challenges of Governance for Sustainable Peace
 SAPI – 8: (20 May 2009), Hotel de l’Annapurna, Kathmandu, Nepal Rebuilding Trust and Reconciliation in the ongoing Peace Process
 SAPI – 9: (23 June 2009), Hotel Yak and Yeti, Kathmandu, Nepal Innovative Approaches to Unity and Peace in Asia
 SAPI – 10: (30 April 2011), Peace Embassy Building, Kathmandu, Nepal Promoting Human Security through Transformational Leadership: Common Challenge of South Asia
 SAPI – 11: (December 15, 2012), Safi Landmark Hotel, Kabul, Afghanistan Innovative Approaches to Sustainable Peace and Development
 SAPI-12: (January 24, 2013) Civil Services Officers Institute, New Delhi, India India's Perspective on Nepal's Peace Process
 SAPI-13: (April 14, 2013), Hotel Yak and Yeti, Kathmandu, Nepal Achieving Meaningful Democracy in South Asia: Challenges and Prospects
 SAPI-14 (August 7, 2013), Hotel Yak and Yeti, Kathmandu, Nepal) Realizing South Asian Dream : Democracy, Peace and Development.
 SAPI-15 (November 8, 2014), Hotel De'l Annapurna, Kathmandu, Nepal) Sustainable Peace in South Asia : New Strategies for A Better Tomorrow.
 SAPI -16 (February 20, 2015), The Malla Hotel, Kathmandu, Nepal) The Increasing Challenges from Extremism to Democracy: Issues and Responses.

 SAPI -17 (October 4, 2015), (The Ashoka Hotel, New Delhi, India )'Recent Developments in Nepal and India-Nepal Relations'.

References

International organizations based in Asia